Mile Akmadžić (born 1 October 1939) is a Bosnian Croat former politician who served as the 2nd Prime Minister of the Republic of Bosnia and Herzegovina from 9 November 1992 until 25 October 1993, during the Bosnian War.

He was born in Grude, PR Bosnia and Herzegovina, FPR Yugoslavia. He and his wife Mijana have two children, Ornela and Hrvoje. From 1964 through 1978, Akmadžić worked for Energoinvest, managing international relations. He was an organizer for the 1984 Winter Olympics in Sarajevo, where he received his B.S. in 1965 from the University of Sarajevo. Akmadžić served as Chief of Staff to the Presidency of Bosnia and Herzegovina from 1991 till 1992, having served in the Presidency since 1978.

References

1939 births
Living people
People from Grude
Croats of Bosnia and Herzegovina
University of Sarajevo alumni
Croatian Democratic Union of Bosnia and Herzegovina politicians
Politicians of the Bosnian War